Animal models of stroke are procedures undertaken in animals (including non-human primates) intending to provoke pathophysiological states that are similar to those of human stroke to study basic processes or potential therapeutic interventions in this disease. Aim is the extension of the knowledge on and/or the improvement of medical treatment of human stroke.

Classification by cause
The term stroke subsumes cerebrovascular disorders of different etiologies, featuring diverse pathophysiological processes. Thus, for each stroke etiology one or more animal models have been developed:
Animal models of ischemic stroke
Animal models of intracerebral hemorrhage
Animal models of subarachnoid hemorrhage and cerebral vasospasm
Animal models of sinus vein thrombosis

Transferability of animal results to human stroke
Although multiple therapies have proven to be effective in animals, only very few have done so in human patients. Reasons for this are (Dirnagl 1999):
Side effects: Many highly potent neuroprotective drugs display side effects which inhibit the application of effective doses in patients (e.g. MK-801)
Delay: Whereas in animal studies the time of incidence onset is known and therapy can be started early, patients often present with delay and unclear time of symptom onset
“Age and associated illnesses: Most experimental studies are conducted on healthy, young animals under rigorously controlled laboratory conditions. However, the typical stroke patient is elderly with numerous risk factors and complicating diseases (for example, diabetes, hypertension and heart diseases)” (Dirnagl 1999)
Morphological and functional differences between the brain of humans and animals: Although the basic mechanisms of stroke are identical between humans and other mammals, there are differences.
Evaluation of efficacy: In animals, treatment effects are mostly measured as a reduction of lesion volume, whereas in human studies functional evaluation (which reflects the severity of disabilities) is commonly used. Thus, therapies might reduce the size of the cerebral lesion (found in animals), but not the functional impairment when tested in patients.

Ethical considerations
Stroke models are carried out on animals which inevitably suffer during the procedure. These encumbrances are e.g. social stress during single or multiple animal caging (depending on the species), transport, animal handling, food deprivation, pain after surgical procedures, neurological disabilities etc. Thus, according to general consensus, these experiments require ethical justification. The following arguments can be produced to give reason for the conduction of animal experiments in stroke research:
Stroke is very frequent in humans.
Stroke is the third leading cause of death in the developed countries.
Stroke is the leading cause of permanent disability in the developed countries.
Yet there is no effective treatment available for the majority of stroke patients.
Currently there are no in vitro methods that could satisfactorily simulate the complex interplay of vasculature, brain tissue, and blood during stroke, and thus could replace the greater part of animal experiments.

During animal experimentation the following prerequisites have to be fulfilled to maintain the ethical justification (“the three Rs”):
Reduction: Animal numbers have to be kept as little as possible (but as high as necessary - to avoid underpowered studies -) to draw scientific conclusions.
Refinement: Experiments have to be best planned and to be conducted by trained personnel to minimize the suffering of animals on the one hand and to gain as much knowledge as possible out of the utilized animals.
Replacement: Whenever possible animal experiments have to be replaced by other methods (e.g. cell culture, computed simulations etc.).

References

Stroke
 Stroke